Sadık Yakut (born 3 February 1956) is a former Turkish politician from the Justice and Development Party (AKP) who served as the Deputy Speaker of the Grand National Assembly from 2002 to 2007 and again from 2009 to 2015. He was a Member of Parliament for Kayseri between 1999 and 2015, first entering Parliament as a Nationalist Movement Party (MHP) politician and then defecting to the AKP to become one of the party's founding members in 2001.

Early life and career
Sadık Yakut was born on 3 February 1956 in the Büyükkaramanlı village of Pınarbaşı, Kayseri. He graduated from Istanbul University Faculty of Law and served as a prosecutor in the districts of Halfeti, Çamardı and Savaştepe and later in the provinces of Giresun and Ankara. He was a research judge and later a head of department and the Ministry of Justice Department of Prisons and Detention Houses.

Political career
Yakut entered Parliament as a member of the Nationalist Movement Party (MHP) in the 1999 general election as an MP for Kayseri. In 2001, he left the MHP to join the bloc of 'modernist' independent former Felicity Party MPs and eventually became a founding member of the Justice and Development Party (AKP).

Yakut became the Deputy Speaker of the Grand National Assembly after the AKP's victory in the 2002 general election, during which he was re-elected as an MP for Kayseri. He served until 2007 and was re-elected as an MP in the 2007 general election, returning to his role as Deputy Speaker in 2009. He was re-elected as an MP for a final time in the 2011 general election, continuing as Deputy Speaker until 2015, in which he was barred from running for election due to the AKP's three-term limit on its MPs.

See also
Deputy Speaker of the Grand National Assembly

References

External links
MP profile at the Parliament website
Collection of all relevant news items at Haberler.com

Justice and Development Party (Turkey) politicians
Nationalist Movement Party politicians
Deputy Speakers of the Grand National Assembly of Turkey
1956 births
Deputies of Kayseri
Members of the 24th Parliament of Turkey
Members of the 23rd Parliament of Turkey
Members of the 22nd Parliament of Turkey
People from Pınarbaşı, Kayseri
Members of the 21st Parliament of Turkey
Living people
Istanbul University Faculty of Law alumni